Mount Sempu is a volcano in the northern arm of Sulawesi, Indonesia, which contains a 3 km wide  caldera. A maar, called Kawah Masem, was formed in the south-west of the caldera and contains a crater lake. Sulfur deposits have been extracted from the maar since 1938. Historical records, however, are unknown from the volcano.

See also 

 List of volcanoes in Indonesia

References 

Active volcanoes of Indonesia
Mountains of Sulawesi
Volcanoes of Sulawesi
Maars of Indonesia
Volcanic crater lakes
Calderas of Indonesia
Landforms of North Sulawesi